Progresistas was a center-left political coalition in Argentina, led by Margarita Stolbizer. It was composed of Generation for a National Encounter, the Freemen of the South Movement, the Socialist Party and the Authentic Socialist Party.

Margarita Stolbizer was candidate for the presidency of Argentina in the 2015 Argentine general election for the Progresistas ticket. She finished fifth with 2.51% of the vote, not enough to pass the threshold for the run-off. In that election, the coalition's list got only one deputy elected to the Chamber of Deputies (Victoria Donda).

In the 2017 legislative election, the coalition's member parties formed different electoral alliances, and in the resulting composition of the National Congress, the Progresistas group was disbanded.

Members 
Progresistas was composed of:

Electoral performance

President

Legisladores

National Deputies

National Senators

See also
Broad Front UNEN
Broad Progressive Front

References

2015 establishments in Argentina
Defunct political party alliances in Argentina
Socialist parties in Argentina